Scott Kent is a Canadian politician, who was elected to in the Yukon Legislative Assembly in the 2000, 2011 and 2016 Yukon elections. He currently represents the Whitehorse electoral district of Copperbelt South as a member of the Yukon Party caucus.

Political career

30th Legislative Assembly

Kent was first elected to the Yukon Legislative Assembly as MLA for Riverside on April 17, 2000, for the Yukon Liberal Party as part of the short-lived government of Premier Pat Duncan. Kent served as Deputy Chair of Committee of the Whole from June 5, 2000 to June 12, 2001. He was appointed to the Standing Committee on Public Accounts and the Standing Committee on Rules, Elections and Privileges during the 30th Legislative Assembly.

In June 2001, Kent was appointed to the Executive Council (Cabinet) as Minister of Economic Development. He later acquired responsibility for the Department of Infrastructure, the Department of Energy, Mines and Resources, and the Yukon Development Corporation/Yukon Energy Corporation. He was also the Minister responsible for Youth. Kent's riding of Riverside was dissolved prior to the 2002 election, and he opted to run for re-election in the newly created riding of Porter Creek Centre. However, he was defeated by Archie Lang of the Yukon Party.

33rd Legislative Assembly

Kent re-entered territorial politics in 2011, when he crossed the floor to join the Yukon Party. He was elected in the riding of Riverdale North - which included part of his former riding of Riverside - in that year's election. He was appointed again to Cabinet on November 5, 2011, serving as Minister of Education, Minister responsible for the Yukon Housing Corporation, Minister responsible for the Yukon Liquor Corporation (including the Yukon Lottery Commission), Minister of Energy, Mines and Resources, Minister responsible for the Yukon Development Corporation and Yukon Energy Corporation, Minister of Energy, Mines and Resources, and Minister of Highways and Public Works. During his time Minister of Education, his department drew criticism for its handling of the Catholic school system's stance on homosexuality, which came to light in a school document which labeled homosexual urges a "disorder" and homosexual acts an "intrinsic moral evil.". Kent was later moved out of the education portfolio in August 2013.

Kent also served on the Standing Committee on Public Accounts, the Standing Committee on Rules, Elections and Privileges and the Standing Committee on Appointments to Major Government Boards and Committees during the 33rd Legislative Assembly.

34th Legislative Assembly

Kent once again sought re-election in 2016, but this time in the riding of Copperbelt South. Kent received criticism for moving out of his riding, and then for not seeking re-election in his current riding and then seeking re-election in a riding that was different than the one he was moving to. Nonetheless, although the Yukon Party was defeated in the general election, Kent was elected in Copperbelt South, defeating popular Whitehorse city councillor and Liberal candidate Jocelyn Curteanu by just 24 votes.

He is currently the Yukon Party caucus critic for the Department of Education, the Department of Economic Development, and the Oil, Gas and Mineral Resources Division of the Department of Energy, Mines and Resources. He is also the Official Opposition House Leader. Kent is currently a member of the Standing Committee on Rules, Elections and Privileges.

Personal life

Outside of politics, Kent has worked in a family-owned business and for a number of organizations, including the Yukon Environmental and Socio-Economic Assessment Board (YESAB), the Yukon Chamber of Mines, the Klondike Placer Miners Association, and the Yukon Hospital Foundation.

Electoral record

2021 general election

2016 general election

|-

|-

| Liberal
| Jocelyn Curteanu
| align="right"| 425
| align="right"| 34.9%
| align="right"| +18.6%
|-

| NDP
| Lois Moorcroft
| align="right"| 397
| align="right"| 27.2%
| align="right"| -14.8%
|-

|-
! align=left colspan=3|Total
! align=right| 1217
! align=right| 100.0%
! align=right|
|}

2011 general election

|-

|-
!align=left colspan=3|Total
!align=right|986
!align=right|100.0%
!align=right| –

2002 general election

|-

|Liberal
|Scott Kent
|align="right"|312
|align="right"|40.3%
|align="right"| –
|-

|NDP
|Judi Johnny
|align="right"|63
|align="right"|8.1%
|align="right"| –
|- bgcolor="white"
!align="left" colspan=3|Total
!align="right"|774
!align="right"|100.0%
!align="right"| –

2000 general election

|-

| Liberal
| Scott Kent
| align="right"|359
| align="right"|54.3%
| align="right"| +15.4%

| NDP
| Jasbir Randhawa
| align="right"|202
| align="right"|30.6%
| align="right"| -7.2%

| Yukon Party
| Michael Weinert
| align="right"|100
| align="right"|15.1%
| align="right"| -8.2%
|-
! align=left colspan=3|Total
! align=right|661
! align=right|100.0%
|}

References

Yukon Party MLAs
Living people
Politicians from Whitehorse
Yukon Liberal Party MLAs
21st-century Canadian politicians
Members of the Executive Council of Yukon
Year of birth missing (living people)